

Notable alumni
Monalisa Chinda, actress
Ebele Ofunneamaka Okeke, civil engineer

References

External links

Schools in Port Harcourt
Girls' schools in Rivers State
Anglican schools in Nigeria
1943 establishments in Nigeria
1940s establishments in Rivers State
Educational institutions established in 1943
Secondary schools in Rivers State
Elelenwo, Port Harcourt